This is a list of colleges and universities in Mozambique:

References 
List of medical schools in AfricaPrivate

 
Universities
Mozambique
Mozambique